The Field Elm cultivar Ulmus minor 'Lanuginosa' was mentioned (as Ulmus suberosa var. lanuginosa) by Lavallée  in Arboretum Segrezianum 236. 1877, but without description.

Description
Not available.

Cultivation
No specimens are known to survive.

References

Field elm cultivar
Ulmus articles missing images
Ulmus
Missing elm cultivars